Raymond Pichard (10 April 1913 – 24 February 1992) was a French Dominican priest, who became best known for presenting the television show Le Jour du Seigneur.

Biography

The first Christmas Mass shown on television was broadcast in 1948 from Notre-Dame de Paris. This inspired the priest Raymond Pichard to persuade the French  Minister of Information, François Mitterrand to create  a weekly 90-minute religious program on RTF. From October 9, 1949, a Catholic program was broadcast consisting of Mass, news, the history of the Church, and Christian lectures.

In 1950, Pichard created the production company Comité français de radio-télévision (CFRT) to broadcast religious programming on a weekly basis for 90 minutes, which would be entitled Le Jour du Seigneur in 1954. Le Jour du Seigneur is the longest running French television show.  Raymond Pichard presented Le Jour du Seigneur from 1954 to 1975. Raymond Pichard was also  the co-founder of Radio-Loisirs which later became Télérama.

Pichard also created Missionnaires de l'Audiovisuel in Rwanda in 1963.

Bibliography
 Radio-télévision pour le Christ: histoire de la radio et de la télévision catholiques Janick Arbois, Raymond Pichard, A. Fayard, 1960, 120 p.
 André Morelle, Raymond Pichard, le dominicain cathodique, Buchet-Chastel, 2009, 197 p.

References

External Links

Comité français de radio-télévision

1913 births
1992 deaths
Clergy from Normandy
French television presenters
French Dominicans
20th-century French Roman Catholic priests
People from Calvados (department)